Axel Tony (born in Colombes in 1984) is a French singer of mixed Cameroonian / Martinique / Vietnamese origin. He is signed to Universal Music France.

Career
Axel Tony was born to a Cameroonian father and a Martiniquais-born mother (of Vietnamese descent) and grew up on a mix of African rhythms, zouk and R&B music. His father Tonye Jackson was a well-known singer in Cameroon and a choir director.

As an adolescent, he took part in the choir "We Are One" that included a number of known artists and appeared on a number of variety programmes on French television. In 2006, he joined as a backing vocals for rapper Diam's on her European tour performing on around 50 venues in France, Belgium and Switzerland. Other gigs included backing vocals for rapper Kery James singing on James' "Lettre à mon public" as a single solo backing vocals in the refrains.

In 2009–2010, he branche to zouk collaborating with zouk artists Thayna and Imélie Monteiro, featured in their hit "Elle ou moi" written by Talina. Following the commercial success of the song, he toured in France and the Antilles and started working on a solo album project. Called Zouk et plus si affinité it is a mix of zouk, soul, R&B and gospel elements. Collaborations included Kayliah, Talina, Stony, and young artists Erika Azur and Jahmikal. The debut official single from the album "Les feux de l'amour" followed by "Pause Kizomba".

His greatest commercial success though came with "Avec Toi" that featured Tunisiano reaching No. 7 in SNEP French Singles Chart.

Discography

Albums

Singles

Other singles
2011: "Les feux de l'amour"
2011: "Pause Kizomba"
2013: "Sensualité" (with Sheryfa Luna)
2016: "Je t'aimais, je t'aime, je t'aimerai"

Featured in

References

External links
Official website
Twitter

French-language singers
1984 births
Living people
French people of Cameroonian descent
French people of Martiniquais descent
People from Colombes
French people of Vietnamese descent
21st-century French singers
21st-century French male singers